Joan and the Voices is a 2011 Armenian drama film directed by Mikayel Vatinyan. The film had its world premiere at the 2011 Busan International Film Festival.

Cast
 Armine Anda
 Mikayel Vatinyan

References

External links
 

2011 films
Armenian-language films
Armenian drama films
2011 drama films